This page shows the results of the Wrestling Competition at the 1997 Bolivarian Games, held in Arequipa, Peru.

Men's competition

Greco-Roman

Freestyle

References
Results database

Sports at the Bolivarian Games
1997 in sport wrestling
1997 Bolivarian Games
Wrestling in Peru